Hambone may refer to:

People
 Hambone Willie Newbern (1899–1947), a guitar-playing blues musician
Hambone Williams or Art Williams (1939–2018), American basketball player

Other
 Hambone (magazine), a literary magazine
 Hambone, California, United States community
 Hambone or Juba dance, dance style
 "Hambone", a song by Red Saunders (musician)
 Hambone, a bowling term referring to four strikes in a row, coined by Rob Stone (sportscaster)
 Hambone's Meditations, a comic strip

See also
Ham on the bone